Sujon Hawlader (born 23 June 1995) is a Bangladeshi first-class cricketer who plays for Rajshahi Division. He made his List A debut for Abahani Limited in the 2016–17 Dhaka Premier Division Cricket League on 29 April 2017. He made his Twenty20 debut for Shinepukur Cricket Club in the 2018–19 Dhaka Premier Division Twenty20 Cricket League on 25 February 2019.

References

External links
 

1995 births
Living people
Bangladeshi cricketers
Abahani Limited cricketers
Rajshahi Division cricketers
Shinepukur Cricket Club cricketers
Place of birth missing (living people)